{{Infobox university
|name= Universidade de Santiago
|image=Universidade de Santiago.jpg
|image_size=
|image_name = 
|caption=
|motto="O futuro ao teu alcance"
|type=Private
|address=
|city=Assomada
|country=Cape Verde
|coordinates=
|native_name=
|established=November 24, 2008
|rector= Gabriel António Monteiro Fernandes
|president= Luis Rodrigues
|affiliation=
|revenue=
|campus=Assomada, Praia, Tarrafal
|academic_staff= 85
|students= ≈ 900
|website=
}}
The Universidade de Santiago (abbreviation: US) is a private Cape Verdean university. The main campus is in Assomada (subdivision Bolanha), located in the middle of the Island of Santiago. There are two satellite campuses, one in Praia (subdivision Prainha) and another one in Tarrafal. It is one of the eight existing universities in Cape Verde; it was established on November 24, 2008. Since its opening in 2008, it has been run by the current rector Gabriel António Monteiro Fernandes, who holds a Ph.D. in Sociology.

As of August 2018, the university of Santiago offers nineteen (17) undergraduate degrees,  and seven (7) graduate (master's degrees) degrees. In addition, it offers vocational degrees, such as multimedia development, electromechanics studies and solar power system, and rural tourism and ecology.

Campuses

Assomada: in the first two years after its establishment in 2008, the university was located at Rua 5 de Julho in Assomada. In 2010 it moved to the present campus in Bolanha, a subdivision in the east of Assomada. The Assomada campus also houses the university administration.

Praia: in 2012, the Praia campus was established at the Seminário São José'' in the subdivision of Prainha. It houses the College of Technology and Management (Escola Superior de Tecnologias e Gestão - ESTG).

Tarrafal: this campus opened in June 2013, and houses the College of Tourism, Businesses and Administration (Escola Superior de Turismo, Negócios e Administração - ESTNA).

Courses
Below are the 4-year courses (majors) offered at the University of Santiago:

Department of Educational Sciences, Philosophy and Letters
Degree in Education Sciences
Degree in Journalism and Enterprise Communications
Degree in Natural Science and Mathematic Studies
Degree in History and Geography Sciences
Degree in Portuguese-French Language Studies
Degree in Portuguese-English Language Studies
Degree in French Language Studies
Degree in English Language Studies
Degree in Philosophy

Department of Health Sciences, Environment and Technology
Degree in Nursing
Degree in Geography and Spatial Planning
Degree in Information and Communications Technology
Degree in Nutrition and Food Quality
Degree in Management Information
Degree in Engineering Information

Department of Economic Sciences and Businesses
Degree in Accounting and finance
Degree in Economy
Degree in Enterprise Management
Degree in Marketing and Multimedia
Degree in Public Relations and Business Communications
Degree in Human Resource Management

Department of Juridicial and Social Sciences
Law Degree
Degree in History
Degree in Social Services and Public politics
Degree in Sociology

Research
In 2013, the Research and Development Institute (Instituto de Pesquisa e Desenvolvimento – IPED), an institutional organ created by guide, management and encourage the development of quality on scientific research, at an institutional level.

The university still keeps, the research and scientific dissemination, as the following academic reviews:
Lantuna – Capeverdean Review on Education, Philosophy and Letters (named after a traditional instrument of the island)
Juridicial Review of Universidade de Santiago
Capeverdean Review on Social Sciences

Extension
The level of its university extension keeps the following projects:
Projecto Grandes Dossiers Cabo Verde (Great Dossiers of Cape Verde)
Project “Nha Skola Nha Kaza”
Programa Rotas do Arquipélago (Routes of the Archipelago Program)
Projecto Santiago Solidário (Project Solidarity Santiago)
Projecto US Comunidades

See also 
 Jean Piaget University of Cape Verde
 University of Cape Verde - the national level university
 University of Mindelo or São Vicente - located in Mindelo on the island of São Vicente - it is also the university for the Barlavento Islands

References

External links 
 Official website 

Universities in Cape Verde
Education in Santiago, Cape Verde
Assomada
Praia
Mindelo
Educational institutions established in 2008
2008 establishments in Cape Verde